The Bronzen Adhemar (Dutch for "Brass Adhemar") is the official Flemish Community Cultural Prize for Comics, given to a Flemish comics author for his body of work. It is awarded by the Flemish Ministry of Culture during Strip Turnhout, the major Flemish comics festival, once every two years.

History
Continuing the idea of a comics award given once in 1972, the prize was definitely installed by the makers of the magazine Ciso in 1977, "to emphasize and enhance the quality of Flemish comics". From 1979 on, the winner also got an exposition during the festival in Turnhout. The prize then changed from yearly to two-yearly.

The organisation of the Award was transferred to the "Bronzen Adhemar Stichting" in 1991, and again to the Flemish Community in 2003, when a monetary prize of 12,500 Euro was added to the statue all winners received.

The name
The "Bronzen Adhemar" (Brass Adhemar) is named after Adhemar, the son of Nero, one of the classic Flemish comics. Twice, a "Gouden Adhemar" (Golden Adhemar) was awarded on special occasions.

Winners
 1972: Ciso-Award for Bob De Moor
 1977: Hec Leemans and Daniel Janssen for Bakelandt
 1978: Kamagurka for Bert
 1979: Karel Biddeloo for De Rode Ridder
 1981: Jean-Pol for Kramikske
 1983: Merho for Kiekeboe' 1985: Berck for Sammy and Lowietje 1987: Erika Raven for Thomas Rindt 1989: Johan De Moor for Kasper 1991: Jan Bosschaert for Sam and Omni 1993: Eric Joris for Chelsey Gouden Adhemar: Marc Sleen
 1995: Dirk Stallaert for Nino and Nero 1997: Ferry for De kronieken van Panchrysia (The chronicles of Panchrysia) 1999: Erik Meynen for De jaren van Dehaene (The years of Dehaene) 2001: Marvano for The Forever War and Dallas Barr 2003: Dick Matena for De Avonden (The evenings). Matena is Dutch but lives in Belgium since the mid-1980s.
 2005: William Vance for XIII and Bob Morane Gouden Adhemar: Jef Nys
 2007: Kim Duchâteau
also nominated: Luc Cromheecke, and Simon Spruyt and Fritz Van den Heuvel
 2009: Willy Linthout for Het Jaar van de Olifant 2011: Steven Dupré for Sarah en Robin 
 2013: Marc Legendre for Biebel 
 2015: Luc Cromheecke for Plunk'' 
 2018: Jeroen Janssen
 2020: Charel Cambré

References

External links
Strip Turnhout

Comics awards
Belgian comics
Belgian awards
Awards established in 1977
The Adventures of Nero